The Identity and Unity Party is an Armenian political party in Artsakh.

History
The Identity and Unity Party was established on 6 April 2019. Its founder and current party leader is Erik Mkrdumyan. The party currently has no parliamentary representation within the National Assembly and acts as an extra-parliamentary force.

Electoral record
Prior to the 2020 Artsakhian general election, the party announced its intentions to join the New Artsakh Alliance. The alliance pledged to support Masis Mayilyan for the presidential nomination. Following the election, the alliance gained just 4.60% of the votes after the first round of voting. As such, the alliance failed to gain any seats in the National Assembly. On 30 May 2020, Erik Mkrdumyan met with Speaker of the National Assembly, Arthur Tovmasyan, to discuss the party's readiness to cooperate on various issues aimed at the development of the country.

Ideology
The party supports the continued development of Artsakh, ensuring the security of the country and its citizens, and eventually unifying Artsakh with Armenia.

See also

 List of political parties in Artsakh
 Politics of Artsakh

References

External links	
 Identity and Unity Party on Facebook

Political parties in the Republic of Artsakh
Political parties established in 2019